Hippotion celerio, the vine hawk-moth or silver-striped hawk-moth, is a moth of the family Sphingidae. It was described by Carl Linnaeus in his 1758 10th edition of Systema Naturae.

Distribution 
It is found in Africa and central and southern Asia of India, Sri Lanka and, as a migrant in southern Europe and Australia.

Description 

Colouring and marks 
The body and forewing of the adult moth are green and ochre. They have silvery white dots and streaks, with a silvery band running obliquely on the forewing. The hindwing is red near its lower angle (tornus) to pinkish over other parts of the wing. It is crossed by a black bar and black veins. There is greater variation. In f. pallida Tutt the ground coloration is a pale terracotta ground; in f. rosea Closs, the wings have a red suffusion; in f. brunnea Tutt, the suffusion is deep brown. In f. augustei Trimoul, the black markings cover the entire wings; in f. luecki Closs, all silver markings are absent and in f. sieberti Closs, the forewing oblique stripe is yellowish, not silver.

Similar species
Hippotion osiris larger size and lacks the black venation on the hindwing.
Hippotion aporodes may be only a very dark subspecies of celerio - in this form, the silvery streak on the forewing is not present but other markings are intensified. In addition, the hindwing is mainly brownish.

Biology

Larva 
Larvae may be green, yellowish green or even brown. They have a dark broken mid-dorsal line and a creamy dorso-lateral line from the fifth segment to the horn. The head is round, and usually a dull green colour. The larva has a horn which is usually long and straight. There is a large yellow and green eyespot on the third segment and a smaller one on the fourth segment.

Larvae typically feed on the leaves of plants such as the grape vine, Cissus, Impatiens and the Arum lily.

References

Pinhey, E. (1962): Hawk Moths of Central and Southern Africa. Longmans Southern Africa, Cape Town.

External links

Silver-striped Hawk-moth at UKMoths

Lepiforum e.V.

Hippotion
Moths of Africa
Moths of Asia
Moths of Europe
Moths of Oceania
Moths of the Middle East
Moths of Australia
Moths of Borneo
Moths of Cape Verde
Moths of the Comoros
Moths of Iceland
Moths of Indonesia
Moths of Japan
Moths of Korea
Moths of Madagascar
Moths of Malaysia
Moths of Mauritius
Moths of New Guinea
Moths of New Zealand
Moths of Réunion
Moths of Seychelles
Moths described in 1758
Taxa named by Carl Linnaeus